Alison R. Fout is an American inorganic chemist at the University of Illinois at Urbana-Champaign where she holds the rank of associate professor.  She has contributed to the discovery of new catalysts with NHC ligands.  She discovered a family of catalysts that reduce oxyanions such as nitrate, perchlorate to nitric oxide and chloride, respectively.

Recognition
As an independent investigator, she received the following recognition:
2017 Camille and Henry Dreyfus Teacher Scholar Award
2016–2021 U. S. Department of Energy Early Career Research Program
2015 Marion Milligan Mason Award for Women in the Chemical Sciences, AAAS
2015 Sloan Research Fellowship
2014 National Science Foundation CAREER Awards

She also was recognized from scientific journals. In 2016, she received recognition as New Talent Americas from Dalton Transactions. That same year, the American Chemical Society awarded her as an Emerging Investigator in Bioinorganic Chemistry.  In 2019 she received the Thieme Chemistry Journals Award. In 2017 she presented the Dalton Lectures at the University of California, Berkeley.  At the 2018 Metals in Biology Gordon Conference, she received the Ed Stiefel Young Investigator Award.

References 

1984 births
Living people
21st-century American chemists
American women chemists
Inorganic chemists
Indiana University alumni
University of Illinois Urbana-Champaign faculty
21st-century American women scientists